Flying Officer Donald Edward Garland, VC (28 June 1918 – 12 May 1940) was a bomber pilot in the Royal Air Force and a recipient of the Victoria Cross, the highest award for gallantry in the face of the enemy that can be awarded to British and Commonwealth forces.

Early life
Born in Ballinacor, County Wicklow, Garland was a pupil at Cardinal Vaughan Memorial School, Holland Park, London from 1929 to 1935, and left with a good all-round School Certificate.

After spending some time at an insurance office, he joined the Royal Air Force (RAF) on a short-term commission. Mgr. Canon J. Vance, who became headmaster of Cardinal Vaughan School in 1928: "In those days I questioned young men closely before recommending their applications for short-term commissions because of a lurking fear that they might be forced to start life again at an awkward age, for Donald I had no misgivings whatever. He could start his life again at any time and was bound to succeed because of his independence and of his resourcefulness. I salute Garland's great heroism"

Victoria Cross
Garland was 21 years old, and a flying officer in No. 12 Squadron during the Second World War, when the following deed took place for which he was awarded the VC.

On 12 May 1940, over the Albert Canal, Belgium, two bridges, Veldwezelt and Vroenhoven, were being used by the invading army, with protection from fighter aircraft, anti-aircraft and machine-guns. The RAF was ordered to demolish one of these vital bridges, and five Fairey Battle bombers were despatched, with Flying Officer Garland leading the attack. They encountered heavy anti-aircraft fire, and the bridge was hit but not put out of commission. Garland and his navigator, Sergeant Thomas Gray, attacked the bridge at Veldwezelt. They died either crashing in the village of Lanaken or in the hospital in Maastricht, Netherlands.  Only one bomber managed to return to base. Sergeant Gray was also awarded the VC for this action in a joint citation with Garland.

Garland is buried at the Heverlee War Cemetery in Leuven, Belgium.

Both Garland and Gray were awarded the Victoria Cross posthumously. Leading Aircraftman Reynolds, the third member of the crew, did not receive a medal because he was not in a "decision making" position. Garland's Victoria Cross is displayed at the Royal Air Force Museum London, England.

He had three brothers, all of whom served with the RAF and also died on service:
 Pilot Officer Desmond William Garland – killed in Belgium on 5 June 1942 aged 27
 Flight Lieutenant John Cuthbert Garland – died on 28 February 1943 aged 32
 Flight Lieutenant Patrick James Garland – killed in Holland on 1 January 1945 aged 36

Victoria Cross citation
The announcement and accompanying citation for the decoration was published in supplement to the London Gazette on 11 June 1940, reading

Memorials
A Vickers VC-10 Serial 'XR807' of 101 Squadron was named 'Donald Garland VC & Thomas Gray VC'.

During 2005, to mark its 90th anniversary, No.12 Squadron RAF flew a Tornado GR4 with Flying Officer Garland's and Sgt Gray's name painted under the cockpit as a mark of respect.

There is a monument on the bridge to the operation.

References

External links

Flying Officer D.E. Garland & Sergeant T. Grey in The Art of War exhibition at the UK National Archives

1918 births
1940 deaths
Military personnel from County Wicklow
Irish aviators
People from County Wicklow
Royal Air Force officers
Royal Air Force recipients of the Victoria Cross
Royal Air Force pilots of World War II
British World War II bomber pilots
Irish World War II recipients of the Victoria Cross
People educated at Cardinal Vaughan Memorial School
Royal Air Force personnel killed in World War II
Aviators killed by being shot down
Burials at Heverlee Commonwealth War Graves Commission Cemetery